The Emin Valley is located on the China–Kazakhstan border, in Central Asia. Its main waterway is the Emil River.

Administratively, the Emin Valley occupies areas of Tacheng Prefecture in the Xinjiang Region of north-western China; and in East Kazakhstan Province of eastern Kazakhstan.

Ecology 
The Emin Valley has a steppe ecosystem of mostly grasslands; with two saline lakes, Alakol and Sasykkol; and mountains with temperate climates.

The Emin Valley Steppe is a Palearctic ecoregion in the Temperate grasslands, savannas, and shrublands Biome. It lies within the vast and larger Eurasian Steppe.

Hydrology 
Orographically, the Emil Valley is an endorrheic basin. In the north, the Tarbagatai Mountains separate it from the Lake Zaysan basin, which is part of the basin of the Irtysh River, eventually draining into the Arctic Ocean. In the southeast, another series of mountain ranges separate it from the Dzungarian Basin (Gurbantünggüt Desert).

The Emin Valley's main watercourse is the Emin (Emil) River, which flows in the general western direction, receiving numerous streams flowing from the Tarbagatai Mountains and carrying their water to Lake Alakol.

Lake Alakol and Lake Sasykkol, situated in the western (Kazakhstan) part of the valley, are the homes of the rare Dalmatian pelican and relict gull.

See also 
Eurasian Steppe
Temperate grasslands, savannas, and shrublands

External links 
 
 

China–Kazakhstan border
Valleys of Xinjiang
Valleys of Kazakhstan
Eurasian Steppe
Ecoregions of China
Ecoregions of Kazakhstan
Ecoregions of Asia
Grasslands of China
Grasslands of Kazakhstan
Palearctic ecoregions
Temperate grasslands, savannas, and shrublands